Claire Chitham (born 12 July 1978, in Auckland) is a New Zealand television actress. Claire rose to fame as Waverley Harrison (née Wilson) in the New Zealand TV show Shortland Street, from 1994–1995 and 1997–2005 and Aurora Bay in Outrageous Fortune from 2006–2007.

Career
Her first television role was a guest appearance in The New Adventures of Black Beauty (1990). A recurring guest role in Shortland Street followed, which went on to become core cast, with Chitham starring in the show for seven years as Waverly Wilson (later Harrison).

Chitham next appeared as Aurora Bay, in the second and third seasons of Outrageous Fortune - New Zealand's highest rating drama. Aurora was the longtime love interest of Van West (Antony Starr) - her character died tragically, after being hit by a bus while trying to hide her ex-boyfriend Tyson's (Ben Barrington) stash of drugs.

On 22 August 2007, she began appearing  as Chantelle Rebecchi in the Australian soap opera Neighbours.

In 2008 Chitham appeared in Episode 1 of the Australian television series Canal Road. Her character, Kristen, plays the wife of core cast member Det Snr Const Ray Driscoll (played by Grant Bowler, who also played Wolf, her father in-law-to-be in Outrageous Fortune).

In 2009 Chitham guest starred in the TV series Legend of the Seeker in the episode 'Mirror' (season 1, episode 18).  She also featured in Muller Yoghurt advertisements screened in New Zealand and the UK and guest starred as herself in the New Zealand comedy series The Jaquie Brown Diaries.

Claire appeared as Angela Phillips in Australian feature film The Cup in 2011. Based on the true story  of the 2002 Melbourne Cup race, The Cup was directed by Simon Wincer and starring Brendan Gleeson.

Having studied in New York and Los Angeles, Chitham has also appeared in a number of stage productions, including Rabbit, by Nina Raine; The Real Thing, by Tom Stoppard; and The Only Child, by Simon Stone.

Filmography

Television

Film

Personal life
In early 2006, Chitham married New Zealand musician, TV personality and radio DJ Mikey 'Havoc' Roberts. It was reported in early 2009 that they had separated.  They are now divorced. Chitham remained in their West Auckland marital home following the split.

References

External links
 

1978 births
New Zealand television actresses
Living people
New Zealand soap opera actresses
20th-century New Zealand actresses
21st-century New Zealand actresses